The Astrologer is a 1744 comedy play by James Ralph.

The original Drury Lane cast included William Mills as Stargaze, Richard Yates as Motley, William Havard as Young Whimsey, William Giffard as Young Detrell, Edward Berry as Siftem, Peg Woffington as Laetitia and Anna Marcella Giffard as Clara. The epilogue was written and spoken by David Garrick.

References

Bibliography

 Nicoll, Allardyce. A History of Early Eighteenth Century Drama: 1700-1750. CUP Archive, 1927.

1744 plays
Comedy plays
West End plays
Plays by James Ralph